The House Carpenter's Daughter is an acoustic album by Natalie Merchant. It consists of both traditional songs and cover versions of contemporary folk music. It was released on August 12, 2003 via her web-site and on September 16, 2003 in stores. It was produced by Merchant and released on Myth America Records, her independent label.

Track listing
"Sally Ann" (Jeff Claus/Judy Hyman/Dirk Powell) – 5:47
"Which Side Are You On?" (Florence Reece) – 5:02
"Crazy Man Michael" (Richard Thompson/Dave Swarbrick) – 5:12
"Diver Boy" (traditional, arranged by Natalie Merchant) – 4:45
"Weeping Pilgrim" (traditional, arranged by Natalie Merchant) – 4:11
"Soldier, Soldier" (traditional, arranged by Natalie Merchant) – 3:43
"Bury Me under the Weeping Willow" (A. P. Carter) – 3:20
"House Carpenter" (traditional, arranged by Natalie Merchant) – 6:00
"Owensboro" (traditional, arranged by Natalie Merchant) – 4:21
"Down on Penny's Farm" (traditional, arranged by Natalie Merchant) – 3:41
"Poor Wayfaring Stranger" (traditional, arranged by Natalie Merchant) – 4:17

Personnel 
 Natalie Merchant – vocals
 Elizabeth Steen – acoustic piano, organ, accordion
 Erik Della Penna – guitars, lap steel guitar
 Gabriel Gordon – guitars
 Rich Stearns – banjo
 Graham Maby – bass guitar 
 Allison Miller – drums
 Judy Hyman – fiddle
 The "Menfolk" – backing vocals 

Production
 Natalie Merchant – producer, package design, collages
 George Cowan – engineer 
 Todd Vos – engineer, mixing 
 Emily Lazar – mastering at The Lodge (New York City, New York)
 Sarah Register – mastering assistant 
 Mary Lynch – design assistance
 Daniel de la Calle – portraits

References

Natalie Merchant albums
2003 albums
Covers albums